The 21st Golden Eagle Awards were held September 15, 2003, in Changsha, Hunan province.  Nominees and winners are listed below, winners are in bold.

Television Series

Best Television Series
The Field of Hop/希望的田野Secretary of a Provincial Committee of the CPC/省委书记
DA Division/DA师
Miracle Doctor Xi Laile/神医喜来乐
Red Poppies/尘埃落定
Missile Brigadier/导弹旅长
Liu Laogen Part II/刘老根（第二部）
The Story of Cooking Class/炊事班的故事
The Secret History of Xiaozhuang Queen/孝庄秘史
Big-feet Queen/大脚马皇后

Best Mini-seriesThe Last Caravan of Army/军中最后一个马帮Green Kunlun/绿色昆仑
Starlight in Summer/夏日星光
Gold Carp/金鲤鱼
The Mountain Village Story/山村故事

Best Directing in a Television SeriesZhang Shaolin for The Last Caravan of Army

Best Writing in a Television Series
Wang Chaozhu for Zhang Xueliang

Best Actor in a Television Series
Li Baotian for Miracle Doctor Xi Laile
Wei Zi for DA Division
Chen Baoguo for Emperor Hanwu
Gao Ming for Quiet Promise
Tang Guoqiang for Blood in the Snow

Best Actress in a Television Series
Fan Zhibo for The Female Leader of Tank Squadrons
Song Jia for Red Poppies
Lü Liping for Big-feet Queen
Mei Ting for Re-start Love
Xie Lan for Blood in the Snow
Wang Haiyan for Quiet Promise

Best Art Direction in a Television Series
Geng Wei/Ren Zhiwen/Guo Jian for Paradise Lost

Best Cinematography in a Television Series
Gao Ziyi for Pass L.A.

Best Lighting in a Television Series
Luo Xiaping for Special Citizen

Best Sound Recording in a Television Series
He Ping/Du Xiaohua for DA Division

Favorite Actor
Li Baotian for Miracle Doctor Xi Laile

Favorite Actress
Song Jia for Red Poppies

Literature & Art Program

Best Literature and Art Program
not awarded this year
2003 CCTV New Year's Gala/2003年中央电视台春节联欢晚会
相聚2003—<同一首歌>三周年庆典歌会
第二届ＣＣＴＶ全国电视相声大赛颁奖晚会
The 3rd Golden Eagle Art Festival-TV New Performer Selection第san届中国金鹰电视艺术节电视新秀大赛总决赛晚会
第十届全国青年歌手电视大奖赛
颂歌献给党－广东省喜迎"十六大"大型歌会
我们成功啦－上海市庆祝申博成功大型联欢活动
2003年春节外国人中华才艺大赛
龙腾虎跃梨园风2003年十六省市电视台元旦戏曲晚会

Best Directing for a Literature and Art Program
Jin yue for CCTV New Year's Gala

Best Art Direction for a Literature and Art Program
He Yonghong for Hainan TV Spring Festival Gala

Documentary

Best Television Documentary
Soong Ching-ling/宋庆龄'Old Mirror/老镜子东方之光——"三个代表"与理论创新
史前部落的最后瞬间
Distance of Road Home/回家的路有多长

Best Short DocumentaryPlum Blossom Blooming/腊梅花开阿艾石窟之谜
海路十八里
赶马帮的女人
遥远的画廊

Best Writing and Directing for a Television DocumentaryYu Lijun for 史前部落的最后瞬间

Best Cinematography for a Television Documentary
Sun Kun/Shi Feng/Peng Yang for Distance of Road Home

Best Sound Recording for a Television Documentary
not awarded this year

Children & Teens Program

Best Animation
可可，可心一家人
唐诗故事——枫桥夜泊·题李凝幽居
千千问——摩擦力消失之后—恐龙灭绝之谜

References

External links

2003
2003 in Chinese television
Events in Changsha
Mass media in Changsha